The 2021 Three Nations Cup was a friendly international association football tournament organised and controlled by the Kyrgyz Football Union (KFU). The tournament was held in the Dolen Omurzakov Stadium.

Participating nations 
With FIFA Rankings, as of August 12, 2021
 (101)
 (102)
 (188)

Standings

Matches
Times listed are UTC+06:00.

Statistics

Goalscorers

References

September 2021 sports events in Asia
2021 in Kyrgyzstani football
International association football competitions hosted by Kyrgyzstan